Neith Andrina Hunter is an American former model and actress. She began her modeling career in the 1980s in her home town of San Francisco, California, where she was discovered as a teen by John Casablancas; she was the first graduate of his exclusive model training center. French couturier Hubert de Givenchy offered her an exclusive contract to work for his House of Givenchy in Paris.

She is well known for playing Marcie (better known as "The redheaded woman in the green dress") in the film Born in East L.A.  She would later appear in several other films, including Fright Night 2 (1988) and Silent Night, Deadly Night 4: Initiation (1990).

Career
In the early-1980s, Hunter established herself as a muse of French-based fashion designer Diane Pernet. Hunter went on to become an international model on runways and in print appearing regularly in publications such as Vogue Italia and Victoria's Secret catalogs. Neith worked with photographers Gian Paolo Barbieri, Albert Watson, Sheila Metzner, Arthur Elgort, Guy Bourdin, Helmut Newton, Mario Testino, Irving Penn, Antonio Guccioni, Matthew Rolston and Steven Meisel. Returning to the states, Neith modeled in New York City for American Vogue and became the signature model for avant-garde designer and fashion journalist, Diane Pernet, and worked extensively with photographer Herb Ritts.

She studied acting with Daniel Mann in the mid-1980s, and relocated to Los Angeles. Working with Ritts, Hunter collaborated on the iconic image, Neith with Tumbleweed, for his book, Pictures, as well as, Neith with Shadows and images for Ritts' book, Men / Women. Neith also appeared in books by photographers Matthew Rolston and Gian Paolo Barbieri for Vogue Italia.

Helmut Newton introduced Neith to master sculptor, Robert Graham. Neith became Graham's muse and the two were a couple, during which time Graham sculpted, sketched and photographed Neith for such installations as the Duke Ellington memorial in Central Park and Study for Column 1, in the Rolfe Courtyard, at UCLA.

Hunter would later appear in films and television as an actress making her film debut in  Born in East L.A. (1987). Other films include Less than Zero (1987), Fright Night Part 2 (1988) and Brian Yuzna's Silent Night, Deadly Night 4: Initiation (1990).

Personal life
Hunter attended the California Institute of the Arts and graduated with a BFA degree in studio art in 2002. She has one child with songwriter Andrew Scandal and was married to author Warren Fahy in 2009.

Filmography

Film

Television

References

Sources

External links

 Neith Hunter, Horror Film Icon

Living people
American film actresses
Female models from California
American television actresses
Actresses from San Francisco
California Institute of the Arts alumni
20th-century American actresses
21st-century American women
Year of birth missing (living people)